Manic Panic is a line of cosmetic hair coloring, based in New York and owned by sister musicians Patrice "Tish" and Eileen "Snooky" Bellomo. They opened and operated the original Manic Panic boutique in Manhattan from 1977 until its closure in 1999, when the business was relocated to Long Island City.

The products are vegan and cruelty-free.

References

Retail companies of the United States
Companies based in New York City
Hair coloring